Claude Elmo Holgate (April 22, 1872 - March 29, 1937) was an American wrestler. He competed in the 1904 Summer Olympics. He finished in 4th place in the freestyle wrestling light flyweight class.

References

External links
 

1872 births
1937 deaths
Olympic wrestlers of the United States
Wrestlers at the 1904 Summer Olympics
American male sport wrestlers